"Story of My Life" is the first promo single from Smash Mouth's 2006 album Summer Girl.

The "Story Of My Life" music video was filmed in an episode in Season 6 of the VH1 reality show The Surreal Life, featuring all the housemates from that season, like Florence Henderson, Alexis Arquette, Tawny Kitaen, C.C. DeVille and others.

The song has been used in promotion of Shrek the Third. This is the third instance of a Smash Mouth song being used in some fashion for the Shrek film series. "All Star" and a cover of The Monkees song "I'm a Believer" were both used in the first Shrek film.

Smash Mouth songs
2006 songs
2006 singles
Songs written by Greg Camp
Songs written by Paul Barry (songwriter)